Renzo Cairus Lucarelli (born 12 March 1990 in Montevideo) is a Uruguayan beach volleyball and indoor volleyball player. He currently plays for Urbia Voley Palma in the Spanish Superliga de Voleibol Masculina.

Results
 Pan American Games
 2015 Toronto: 5th (with Mauricio Vieyto)

 FIVB Beach Volleyball World Tour
 2010 Brasilia Open: 41st
 2013 Anapa Open: 17th

 South American Beach Volleyball Circuit
 2014 Brazil: 5th (with Nicolás Zanotta)
 2014 Chile: 4th (with Nicolás Zanotta)

External links
 
 
 Profile at Toronto 2015

1990 births
Living people
Uruguayan beach volleyball players
Men's beach volleyball players
Beach volleyball players at the 2015 Pan American Games
Pan American Games competitors for Uruguay